Saint Pierre Cathedral in Geneva, Switzerland is a former Roman Catholic cathedral that was later converted into a Reformed Protestant Church of Geneva church during the Reformation. 

It is known as the adopted home church of John Calvin, one of the leaders of the Protestant Reformation. Inside the church is a wooden chair used by Calvin.

History
Although this has been the site of a cathedral (a church that is the seat of a bishop) since the fourth century, the present building was begun under Arducius de Faucigny, the prince-bishop of the Diocese of Geneva, around 1160, in Gothic style.  At the time of the Reformation, the interior of the large, cruciform, late-gothic church was stripped of its rood screen, side chapels, and all decorative works of art, except the stained glass, leaving a vast, plain interior that contrasts sharply with the interior of surviving medieval churches that remain Roman Catholic.  A Neo-Classical main façade was added in the 18th century.  In the 1890s, Genevans redecorated a large, side chapel adjacent to the cathedral's man doors in a polychrome,  gothic revival style.  The German painter Konrad Witz painted an altarpiece, the so-called St. Peter Altarpiece, for the cathedral in 1444, now in the Musée d'Art et d'Histoire, Geneva, which contains his  composition, the Miraculous Draught of Fishes.

Currently, every summer a German Protestant minister is present, making it possible to hold bilingual services and meetings of both German and French Protestant worshippers. 

Theodore Beza, French Calvinist Protestant theologian, reformer and scholar, and successor to John Calvin, was buried in St. Pierre in 1605.

On Whit Saturday, 30 May 2020, after nearly 485 years a Catholic Mass was to be celebrated in the cathedral as a symbol of ecumenical hospitality. Because of COVID-19, the Catholic Mass was postponed and was celebrated on Saturday, 5 March 2022.

Bells

Gallery

See also
 List of carillons

References

Further reading

External links

 Official St Pierre Cathedral website—
Izi.travel: Cathedral visitor's guide—
Tibet.ca: "The Dalai Lama visits to the Cathedral" (1999)—
Images
 Gotik-romanik.de: photos of Cathedral
Rawle.org: Aerial view of entire Cathedral
UCLA.edu: Cathedral's stained glass windows
Musiqueorguequebec.ca: Cathedral organ

Geneva
Geneva Cathedral
Cathedral Peter
John Calvin
Tourist attractions in Geneva
Gothic architecture in Switzerland
Geneva Cathedral
Neoclassical church buildings in Switzerland